Arnicourt is a commune in the Ardennes department in the Grand Est region of northern France.

Geography
Arnicourt is located some 6 km north by north-west of Rethel and 8 km south-west of Novion-Porcien. Access to the commune is by the D10 road from Sorbon in the south passing through the commune and the village continuing to Sery in the north. The commune is entirely farmland with a small patch of forest in the north.

The Plumion river flows through the north of the commune from north to south-west joining the Rayee on the south-western border. The Rayee continues south-west forming a small part of the south-western border.

Neighbouring communes and villages

Administration

List of Successive Mayors

Demography
In 2017 the commune had 157 inhabitants.

Sites and monuments
The Church of Saint-Médard.
The Chateau of Arnicourt (18th century) is registered as an historical monument.

Notable people linked to the commune
Gérard Darrieu (1925–2004), actor.

See also
Communes of the Ardennes department

References

External links
Arnicourt on the National Geographic Institute website 
Arnicourt on Géoportail, National Geographic Institute (IGN) website 
Arnicourt on the 1750 Cassini Map

Communes of Ardennes (department)